Pasta 'ncasciata is a celebratory baked pasta dish originating from Messina, Sicily, but today there are many versions from every province of Sicily as well as Calabria in Southern Italy. Ingredients vary according to the region as well as personal preferences. For example, while the dish usually utilizes two types of cheese, besciamella may be used in lieu of one of the cheeses. It was traditionally baked in a dish placed over, as well as covered by, hot coals. The dish was made more well known by Andrea Camillieri’s Inspector Montalbano (TV series).

Variants

Messina

The version from Messina is one of the most common, and is generally made with maccheroni pasta, ragù, fried eggplant, caciocavallo (casciucavaddu in the Sicilian language), pecorino siciliano, white wine, basil and often additional ingredients like soppressata, meatballs, salami, boiled eggs, peas and breadcrumbs.

Ragusa

The version from Ragusa contains peas, crumbled sausage, and ricotta cheese.

Palermo

The version from Palermo substitutes tomato sauce for ragù.

Enna

The Enna version is the most different from the others as it does not utilize ragù, eggplant, or caciocavallo (casciucavaddu in the Sicilian language). Instead it utilizes cauliflower, pecorino siciliano, sausage, and other ingredients.

Syracuse

The Syracuse version is most similar to the versions from neighboring provinces of Ragusa and Enna as it omits the ragù, eggplant, and caciocavallo as well but instead utilizes ricotta, pecorino siciliano, cauliflower, and eggs poured over the dish before baking.

Caltanisetta

In Gela in the province of Caltanisetta, cauliflower is also sometimes used instead of eggplants, and anchovies are sometimes added.

Calabria

The version from Calabria is most similar to the Messina version made with maccheroni pasta, ragù, meatballs, boiled eggs, fried eggplant, caciocavallo (casciucavaddu in the Sicilian language) or provola silana, pecorino siciliano, and often additional ingredients like soppressata, meatballs, salami, boiled eggs and breadcrumbs.

See also

List of Sicilian dishes
List of pasta dishes

References

Cuisine of Sicily
Cuisine of Messina
Palermitan cuisine
Cuisine of Calabria
Cuisine of Ragusa
Cuisine of Enna
Pasta dishes